Ōkārito is a small coastal settlement on the West Coast of New Zealand's South Island,  southwest of Hokitika, and  from . It is built at the southern end of the Ōkārito Lagoon at the mouth of the Ōkārito River. The settlement of The Forks is located just inland, on the banks of the river.

Name 
Another account has Ōkārito taking its name from a rangatira named Kārito, whose daughters Mapourika and Wahapako gave their names to nearby Lake Mapourika and Lake Wahapo. The settlement's official name has been spelled with macrons over the vowels since 2010, although it is still commonly seen written as "Okarito".

History 
Māori occupation and seasonal harvesting in area began over 600 years ago. 

The Ōkārito historic gold mining settlement is home to Donovan's Store, the oldest known building on the West Coast, and the  Ōkārito Memorial Obelisk, a heritage listed obelisk. The obelisk commemorates the 1860 purchase of Westland from local Maori, as well as the date that Abel Tasman and James Cook sailed by, on 13 December 1642 and 23 March 1770 respectively.

Originally a gold mining township, the population reached over 1,500 in 1866. It is now permanent home to only about 30 residents; among them the late Booker Prize-winning writer Keri Hulme and landscape photographer Andris Apse.

Bird watching, eco-tours and kayak tours of the lagoon are available, and there are a number of local walking tracks.

Wildlife 
The rarest species of kiwi, the Okarito kiwi, or rowi, is found near the town of Ōkārito.

The lagoon is one of the main feeding grounds for the White Heron during the spring and summer months, however the White Heron do not nest at Okarito.

References

External links

Okarito Community Association

Westland District
Populated places in the West Coast, New Zealand
West Coast Gold Rush